KJVV is a radio station in Twentynine Palms, California.

History
KJVV began broadcasting on September 11, 2014.

References

External links

Twentynine Palms, California
2014 establishments in California
Radio stations established in 2014
JVV